"Starry Night" (Korean: 별이 빛나는 밤; RR: Byuli bichnaneun bam) is a song by South Korean girl group Mamamoo. It was released on March 7, 2018, as the second single from the group's seventh EP Yellow Flower, the first EP in a series of releases focusing on each member. A dance-pop and Latin-inspired track, "Starry Night" was written by Moonbyul, Park Woo-sang, and Kim Do-hoon, with music and arrangement performed by the latter two. The song peaked at number two on the Gaon Digital Chart and earned the group their first-ever music recording certification, after surpassing 100 million streams according to the Gaon Music Chart.

Background and release 
In January 2018, Mamamoo released the digital single "Paint Me", a precursor to their upcoming album project titled 'Four Seasons, Four Colors', in which the group would release four EPs, each focusing on one member and a corresponding season. The next month, the group released the first teasers for the first EP in the series, Yellow Flower. "Starry Night" was released as the second single from Yellow Flower on March 7, 2018, alongside the release of the EP itself.

On August 7, 2019, the re-recorded Japanese-language version of the song was released as part of the group's debut Japanese album, 4colors, by JVCKenwood Victor Entertainment. On September 15, 2021, an orchestral remix of the song was released as part of their debut compilation album I Say Mamamoo: The Best.

Composition 
Sonically a dance-pop and K-pop track, "Starry Night" is a dance track featuring "Latin-inspired strings." The song is composed in the key of A minor and at a tempo of 124 BPM, running for three minutes and 31 seconds.

Critical reception
"Starry Night" was met with positive critical reception upon release, with Hong Dam-young of The Korea Herald calling it "dramatic" and "dynamic." CelebMix stated that it "confirmed and lived up to the expectations of the fans and the critics" in a year when many K-pop acts were experimenting with Latin music."

Commercial performance
A commercial success, "Starry Night" debuted at number two on the Gaon Digital Chart, earning 44.7 million index points in its first week. It remained at that position for four consecutive weeks, before dropping to number four for the issue dated April 7, 2018. The song was the highest-performing song of March 2018, earning 219 million index points in that time frame. It was the 13th highest-performing song of 2018 on the chart and was the fourth highest-performing song by a girl group, with over 818 million index points earned in 2018. The song earned a further 77 million points in 2019. "Starry Night" also peaked at number one on the Billboard Korea K-pop Hot 100 and number eight on Billboard World Digital Songs Sales.

In November 2018, "Starry Night" earned the group their first platinum certification from the Gaon Music Chart and Korean Music & Content Association for surpassing 100 million domestic streams. It was certified for 2.5 million digital downloads in July 2019.

Music video 

The music video for "Starry Night" was directed by Won Ki-hong. It was shot entirely in New Zealand. Like with their music video for previous single "Paint Me", the music video was posted to both the group's official channel and the 1theK distributor channel. As of February 2022, the music video has a combined total of 201.4 million views across both channels.

Accolades

Track listings 
Digital download
 "Starry Night" – 3:31

Digital download – Japanese version
 "Starry Night" (Japanese version) – 3:31

Digital download – remix
 "Starry Night" (orchestra version) – 3:34

Charts

Weekly charts

Monthly charts

Year-end charts

Release history

References

2018 songs
2018 singles
Mamamoo songs
Billboard Korea K-Pop number-one singles